Peters Bay is a bay of the Greenland Sea in King Christian X Land, Greenland. Administratively it belongs to the NE Greenland National Park area.

History
The bay was first surveyed by Carl Koldewey during the 1869–70 Second German North Polar Expedition. It was named "Peters Bay" after German zoologist and explorer Wilhelm Peters (1815 – 1883), who wrote one of the zoological texts for Koldewey's expedition report. 

It was named Jonsbu (Jónsbú) after Norwegian trapper John Schjelderup Giæver (1901–1970). The station was destroyed by a vessel of the Greenland Patrol in World War II.

Geography
The bay lies in Northeastern Greenland, by the southwestern shore of Hochstetter Foreland, part of Queen Margrethe II Land. The Ardencaple Fjord has its mouth to the SW of the bay, beyond Cape Klinkerfues. The southeasternmost headland is Karls Pynt, north of which lies Lauge Koch Cove (Lauge Koch Vig).

See also
Erik the Red's Land

References

Bays of Greenland